Life After Top Chef is an American reality television series that aired on the Bravo television network. It premiered on October 3, 2012.

Premise
The series follows former Top Chef contestants Richard Blais (Top Chef: Chicago, Top Chef: All-Stars), Jen Carroll (Top Chef: Las Vegas, Top Chef: All-Stars), Spike Mendelsohn (Top Chef: Chicago, Top Chef: All-Stars), and Fabio Viviani (Top Chef: New York, Top Chef: All-Stars) as they pursue their post-Top Chef professional endeavors and provides insight into the chefs' private lives.

Cast
 Richard Blais — Top Chef: Chicago (Runner-Up), Top Chef:All-Stars (Winner). Resides in: Atlanta, Georgia.
 Jennifer Carroll — Top Chef: Las Vegas (4th), Top Chef: All-Stars (17th). Resides in: Philadelphia, Pennsylvania.
 Evangelos "Spike" Mendelsohn — Top Chef: Chicago (5th), Top Chef: All-Stars (14th). Resides in: Washington, D.C.
 Fabio Viviani — Top Chef: New York (4th), Top Chef: All-Stars (8th). Resides in: Los Angeles, California.

Episodes

References

External links
 
 

2010s American reality television series
2012 American television series debuts
2012 American television series endings
Bravo (American TV network) original programming
English-language television shows
Top Chef
Television series by Magical Elves
Reality television spin-offs
American television spin-offs